The Transjakarta Corridor 1 is the TransJakarta bus rapid transit route in Jakarta, Indonesia. The route operates between Blok M Terminal and Jakarta Kota railway station. The roads that are traversed by Corridor 1 are along Jalan Sultan Hasanuddin, Jalan Trunojoyo, Jalan Sisingamangaraja, Sudirman, MH Thamrin, Medan Merdeka Barat, and Gajah Mada / Hayam Wuruk. Key integration points include Dukuh Atas TOD that is currently an integration point for 4 transport modes, Jakarta Kota Station which serves KRL Commuterline and Harmoni Central BRT Station that is one of the main hub in the system. Currently, all bus stations are served by buses 24 hours a day.

History

Background 
The idea of implementing the bus rapid transit system in Jakarta was emerged in 2001 by the Governor of Jakarta at the time, Sutiyoso, which was supported by the Institute for Transportation & Development Policy (ITDP), the United States Agency for International Development (USAID), and other parties.

The route passed by Corridor 1 is the route from Blok M Bus Terminal to Jakarta Kota railway station which passes Jalan Jenderal Sudirman and Jalan M.H. Thamrin as the main street in the central area of ​​the Indonesian economy and government, namely the Golden Triangle of Jakarta. The choice of the Blok M–Kota route for corridor 1 was a form of outsmarting traffic congestion when Jakarta was unable to build a subway system, which had actually been planned by B.J. Habibie in 1985 and had wanted to be pioneered again by Sutiyoso in 1998.

Corridor construction 
The construction of Corridor 1 began around mid-2003, marked by the installation of a "KHUSUS BUSWAY (BUS LANE)" sign on pedestrian bridges and red road markings to mark the separated Transjakarta bus lane. The construction of new bus stops and special lanes began by late 2003, towards 2004 along with the system's socialization. The construction of bus stops and special lanes for corridor 1 received many complaints from the public, due to the bus lane construction distrubs the heavy traffic on Jalan Sudirman and Thamrin during peak hours.

Early operational 

On January 15, 2004, when Jakarta was having a downpour, Transjakarta Corridor 1 was inaugurated by Governor Sutiyoso.

The inauguration of Corridor 1 received a lot of enthusiasm from the people of Jakarta, as evidenced by situation of the Kota and Gelora Bung Karno BRT Stations and buses which was overcrowded by Transjakarta passengers. Despite receiving high enthusiasm, the operation of Corridor 1 was criticized by transportation expert Darmaningtyas 6 days earlier.

Further developments 
 In 2009, the National Monument BRT station which has a small building form was expanded to accommodate passengers in corridor 1 and 2.
 On January 23, 2012, 102 articulated buses that have a higher passenger carrying capacity have started to operate to accommodate the high density of passengers.
 As the impact of the Jakarta MRT phase 1 construction, in 2014, a number of BRT Stations in Corridor 1 had to be relocated or closed. One of the BRT Stations that were relocated were the Masjid Agung, Bundaran Senayan, Polda, and Karet stations which were moved to a location not far from their original location. While the BRT Stations that were closed were the Setiabudi and the Bundaran HI BRT Stations (the Bundaran HI BRT station was rebuilt after the MRT construction was completed in 2019).
 On June 1, 2014, corridor 1 began to service 24 hours a day along with corridor 3 and 9. At the time, the night bus only stop at certain bus stations, but sometime later, all bus stations are served by night bus.
 On late 2018, three pedestrian bridges which are used as the access to the Bundaran Senayan, Gelora Bung Karno, and Polda Metro Jaya BRT Stations, was revitalized and completed in March 2019. The three pedestrian bridges revitalization was followed by the Karet Sudirman pedestrian bridge id which is used as the access to the Karet Sudirman BRT Station in April 2021 and inaugurated in March 2022.
 On March 24, 2019, along with the inauguration of the Jakarta MRT, the rebuilt Bundaran HI BRT Station became the first BRT Station that was directly connected to the MRT Station, even though the connecting access was considered not friendly for disabled.
 As the impact of the Jakarta MRT phase 2A project, Bank Indonesia, Harmoni Central Busway, Sawah Besar, and Mangga Besar BRT stations were moved into a temporary building. The temporary building of the Bank Indonesia bus station began to operate since December 19, 2020, Mangga Besar since February 25, 2023, Sawah Besar since February 28, 2023, and Harmoni Central Busway since March 4, 2023.
 On April 15, 2022, five BRT Stations in Corridor 1, namely Gelora Bung Karno, Tosari, Bundaran HI, Dukuh Atas 1, and Sarinah (now renamed M.H. Thamrin) were temporarily closed for revitalization along with six other Transjakarta shelters on corridor 2, 5, 9 and 11. To accommodate affected passengers, Transjakarta had operated the 1ST (Monumen Nasional–Semanggi) shuttle bus route from April 15 to September 11, 2022. The revitalization of the BRT Stations were to improve service quality, accelerating integration with other transportation modes (such as the MRT and KRL Commuterline), and to create a new icon and tourism spot for Jakarta. The first BRT Station that was revitalized to be completed in Corridor 1 was the Gelora Bung Karno station which began to reopen on August 17, 2022, followed by the Bundaran HI BRT Station on October 6, 2022, Tosari on December 26, 2022, Dukuh Atas 1, and M.H. Thamrin on March 4, 2023.

List of BRT Stations
 Stations indicated by a <- sign has a one way service towards Blok M only. Stations indicated by a -> sign has a one way service towards Kota only.
 *) Semanggi to Bendungan Hilir bus stop via skywalk bridge which is maybe too steep for disable person and takes at least 10 minutes walk.
 Currently, all bus stops are served by buses 24 hours a day.

Fleets 
 Scania K320IA CNG Euro VI, white-light blue (TJ + MB, special livery for Earth day, Kartini Day and Mother's day (TJ))
 Scania K340IA Euro VI, white-light blue (TJ)
 Scania K310IB 6×2, white-blue (MYS)
 Hino RK8 R260, blue (BMP, night bus (22:00 - 05:00))
 Mercedes-Benz OH 1526 NG, white-light blue (TJ, regular bus)
 Mercedes-Benz OH 1526 NG, dark blue-white (TJ, PPD Vintage Series)
 Mercedes-Benz OH 1526 NG, red-white (TJ, special livery for the Independence Day)
 Mercedes-Benz OH 1526 NG, white-pink (TJ, women bus)
 Mercedes-Benz OH 1626 NG A/T, dark blue-white (TJ, PPD Vintage Series)
 Mercedes-Benz OH 1626 NG A/T, dark blue-orange (TJ, PPD Vintage Series)
 Mercedes-Benz OH 1626 NG A/T, white dark blue and orange (TJ, PPD Vintage Series)
 Mercedes-Benz OH 1626 NG A/T, white-blue (MYS)
 Mercedes-Benz OH 1626 NG A/T, light green-red (MYS, MYS Vintage Series)
 Volvo B11R 6×2 A/T, white-blue (SAF)
 Zhongtong Bus LCK6180GC Euro 5, white-dark blue (PPD)

Depots 
 Kayu Putih (TJ)
 Klender (PPD)
 Cawang (TJ)
 Klender (MB)
 Cijantung (MYS)
 Klender (SAF)

Incidents

BRT station burning and destruction 

On October 8, 2020, four BRT stations on Corridor 1 were burned by demonstrators during the Omnibus law protests, those four burned BRT stations are Sarinah (now renamed M.H. Thamrin), Bundaran HI, Tosari, and Karet Sudirman. TransJakarta predicting losses of all 18 BRT station burning and destructions are up to 45 billion rupiah. Other Corridor 1 BRT stations that were damaged by the demonstrators are Harmoni Central, Bank Indonesia, Dukuh Atas 1, and Bendungan Hilir.

Gallery

See also
TransJakarta
List of TransJakarta corridors

References

External links 

 

TransJakarta
Bus routes